This is a list of Apple Macintosh software published by Microsoft. Prior to 1994, Microsoft had an extensive range of actively developed Macintosh software. In 1994, Microsoft stopped development of most of its Mac applications until a new version of Office in 1998, after the creation of the new Microsoft Macintosh Business Unit the year prior.

Pre-Microsoft Macintosh Business Unit (1984-1998)
 Microsoft BASIC Version 1.0 - Version 3.0 (1984–1986)
 Microsoft Multiplan (1984)
 Microsoft Excel Version 1.0 (1985), 1.5 (1988), 2.2 (1989), 3.0 (1990), 4.0 (1992), 5.0 (1993)
 Microsoft Word Version 1.0 (1985), 3.0 (1987), 4.0 (1989), 5.x (1991), 6.0 (1993)
 Microsoft Write 1.0 (1987)
 Microsoft Works Versions 1.0 to 4.0 (1986–1994)
 Microsoft Flight Simulator Version 1.0 (1986), 4.0 (1991)
 Microsoft PowerPoint Version 1.0 (1987), 2.0 (1988), 3.0 (1992), 4.0 (1994)
 QuickBASIC Version 1.0 (1988)
Microsoft Office Version 1.0 (1989)
 Microsoft Project Versions 1.0 to 4.0 (1991–1993)
 Microsoft Art Gallery (1993)
 Microsoft Dinosaurs (1993) 
 Microsoft FoxPro 2 Version 2.6 (1994)
 Microsoft Bookshelf Version 4.0 (1994)
 Ghostwriter Mysteries for Creative Writer: The Case of the Blue Makva (1994) 
 Microsoft Cinemania Version '94, '95, '96, '97 (1994–1996)
 Microsoft Creative Writer (1994)
 Microsoft Dangerous Creatures (1994)
 Microsoft Fine Artist (1994)
 Microsoft Musical Instruments (1994)
 Microsoft Arcade (1995)
 Microsoft Dogs (1995)
 Microsoft Encarta Version '95 (1995), 97 (1996)
 The Magic School Bus (1995)
 Explores Bugs
 Explores in the Age of the Dinosaurs
 Explores inside the Earth
 Explores the Human Body
 Explores the Ocean
 Explores the Rainforest
 Explores the Solar System
 Microsoft Visual C++ Pro Cross Development for Mac 4.0 (1995)
 Microsoft Wine Guide (1995)
 Internet Explorer for Mac Versions 2.0-5.2.3  (1996–2003)
 Microsoft Music Central 96 (1996)
 Microsoft Music Central 97 (1996)
 Microsoft Visual FoxPro Version 3.0 (1996)

Post Microsoft Macintosh Business Unit (1997-Present)
Software in this list is not necessarily written by Macintosh Business Unit, however was/is published by Microsoft Corp. 

 Internet Explorer for Mac 96-05
 Age of Empires
 Microsoft Edge (2019)
 Microsoft FrontPage (1998)
 Microsoft Outlook (1998–2001) 14 (2010), 16 (2018)
 Microsoft Excel Version 8.0 (1998), 9.0 (2000), 10 (2001), 11 (2004), 12 (2008), 14 (2010), 16 (2018)
 Microsoft PowerPoint Version 8.0 (1998), 9.0 (2000), 10.0 (2002), 11.0 (2004), 12.0 (2008), 14 (2010), 16 (2018)
 Microsoft Word Version 8.0 (1998), 9.0 (2000), 10 (2001), 11 (2004), 12 (2008) 14 (2010), 16 (2018)
 Microsoft Entourage (2001–2008)
 Windows Media Player Version 6.3 (2000), 7.0.1 (2001), 7.1 (2002), 9.0 (2003)
 Microsoft Silverlight 
 Microsoft Visual Studio (2017), (2019)
 Microsoft Visual Studio Code (2015)
 Microsoft Virtual PC (2004-6)
 Phase One Media Pro (2010) (formerly Microsoft Expression Media and iView Media Pro)
 Microsoft Windows Phone 7 Connector (Version 1, 2), Microsoft Windows Phone for Mac 3.0
 Skype (since its acquisition by Microsoft in 2011)

External links
 https://web.archive.org/web/20110608022712/http://www.islandnet.com/~kpolsson/compsoft/soft1992.htm
 http://macappstore.org/

References 

Published by Microsoft
Lists of software
Microsoft lists
Microsoft software